Jewell Cemetery State Historic Site is a publicly owned property in Columbia, Missouri,  maintained as a state historic site by the Missouri Department of Natural Resources. Among the notable persons buried in the cemetery, which holds the remains of more than 40 descendants of George A. Jewell, are Missouri governor Charles Henry Hardin and the educator William Jewell. The property became part of the state parks system in 1970.

See also
 Columbia Cemetery
 List of cemeteries in Boone County, Missouri

References

External links

 Jewell Cemetery State Historic Site Missouri Department of Natural Resources
 
 

Missouri State Historic Sites
Buildings and structures in Columbia, Missouri
Cemeteries in Columbia, Missouri
Protected areas established in 1970
Protected areas of Boone County, Missouri
Tourist attractions in Columbia, Missouri
1970 establishments in Missouri
African-American history in Columbia, Missouri